Waris Ali Shaheed railway station is a closed railway station located in Punjab, Pakistan.

See also
 List of railway stations in Pakistan
 Pakistan Railways

References

External links

Railway stations in Khanewal District
Railway stations on Karachi–Peshawar Line (ML 1)